Mahesh Bhupathi and Leander Paes were the defending champions.  They successfully defended their title, defeating Wayne Black and Neville Godwin in the final 4–6, 7–5, 6–4.

Seeds

  Mahesh Bhupathi /  Leander Paes (champions)
  Wayne Black /  Neville Godwin (final)
  Jens Knippschild /  Mikael Tillström (semifinals)
  Michael Kohlmann /  Filippo Veglio (first round)

Draw

Draw

External links
Draw

1999 Gold Flake Open
Maharashtra Open